Olszewiec may refer to the following places in Poland:

Olszewiec, Masovian Voivodeship (east-central Poland)
Olszewiec, Pomeranian Voivodeship (north Poland)